Newburg Township is located in Pike County, Illinois. As of the 2010 census, its population was 949 and it contained 428 housing units.

Geography

Demographics

References

External links
 US Census
 City-data.com
 Illinois State Archives

Townships in Pike County, Illinois
Townships in Illinois